Thomas Roderick Dew (1802–1846) was a professor at and then president of The College of William & Mary. He was an influential pro-slavery advocate.

Biography
Thomas Dew was born in King and Queen County, Virginia, in 1802, son of Captain Thomas Dew and Lucy Gatewood Dew. His father was a Revolutionary War soldier and founder of Dewsville, a prosperous plantation near Newtown, King and Queen County. He attended The College of William & Mary, graduating in 1820, and subsequently spent several years studying in Europe. He was a professor of history, metaphysics, and political economy at William & Mary from 1827 to 1836, then President until his death from bronchitis in 1846. He twice declined invitations to run for political office, as well as invitations to teach at South Carolina College (today the University of South Carolina) and the University of Virginia. Shortly before his death, he married Natalia Hay. He died on their honeymoon, in Paris; his remains were later moved to the crypt under the Wren Chapel on the William & Mary campus. His descendant Charles B. Dew is a professor of Southern history at Williams College, and wrote in The Making of a Racist (2016) of his Southern family's tradition of racism.

Dew came to national prominence in 1828 when he attacked the tariff that passed that year (also known as the "Tariff of Abominations").  He was a proponent of free trade, arguing that export taxes benefited Northern manufacturers at the expense of Southern planters.  He supported state banks over a national bank, stating that centralized banking would give the government too much control over the economy. Dew's largest book was the Digest of the Laws, Customs, Manners, and Institutions of Ancient and Modern Nations (1853). A source was P. Austin Nuttall's 1840 Classical and Archaeological Dictionary.

Pro-slavery advocacy
Dew was an advocate for slavery.

In 1832, he published a review of the celebrated slavery debate of 1831–32 in the Virginia General Assembly, A Review of the Debates in the Legislature of 1831 and 1832, which went far towards putting a stop to a movement, then assuming considerable proportions, to proclaim the end of slavery in Virginia. The Virginia Legislature's debate was a response to Nat Turner's slave rebellion of August 1831. He argued that whites and freed blacks could not live alongside one other in peace. Dew dismissed colonization of freed American blacks in Africa as prohibitively expensive and logistically impractical; that Blacks did not want to go was of no importance to him. He noted also that the deportation of blacks would prevent Virginia from profiting from its breeding and export of negros, as "a negro raising state for other states" of the South. While his position was convincing to many Southern readers, Jesse Burton Harrison, of Lynchburg, Virginia, wrote a robust response that argued that colonization (sending freed slaves to Africa) was possible and that slavery was economically inefficient.

In his inaugural speech as President at William & Mary, "he admonished young planters to resist fanatics who wished to eliminate slavery. Dew emphasized the importance of a broad-based liberal arts education but singled out morals and politics as the most significant subjects of study."

Dew was well respected in the South; his widely distributed writings helped to confirm pro-slavery public opinion. His work has been compared to that of the Southern surgeon and medical authority Samuel A. Cartwright, who defended slavery and invented the "diseases" of drapetomania (the "madness" that makes slaves want to run away), and dysaesthesia aethiopica ("rascality"), both of which were "cured" with beatings. Dew's 1833 Review was republished in 1849, and collected in The Pro-Slavery Argument, together with writings by  Harper, Hammond and Simms.

Many people at the time credited Dew with the defeat of the proposal to end slavery in Virginia in the 1830s. He was opposed to even gradual emancipation. Dew's teaching and his writings influenced the following generations, which opposed Reconstruction and created Jim Crow.

Dew on men and women
In the Dictionary of Virginia Biography, Dew's views on the differences between the sexes are described as follows:

He described the hardships faced by men in the marketplace and the almost brutal strength needed to survive in such a competitive atmosphere. He stated that courage and boldness are man's attributes. For Dew, women were dependent and weak, but a spring of irresistible power.

Works by Thomas R. Dew
 
 
 
  (The "first edition" is the 1833 publication cited above.)
 
 
 
 
 
  (16 page pamphlet)

Briefer pieces, letters, speeches

Archival material
Dew's family papers and papers from his time as president of the College of William and Mary can be found at the Special Collections Research Center at the College of William and Mary.

Media
 A non-existent book by Dew, Inequality Is the Basis of Society, appears in the Spaghetti Western Sabata (1969), in which the book is read by a villain. A character reads a quotation from it: "The responsibility of command is to use lesser men."

References

Further reading (arranged by date)
 

 

 
 
 

1802 births
1846 deaths
Economists from Virginia
American legal writers
College of William & Mary alumni
College of William & Mary faculty
American proslavery activists
People from Williamsburg, Virginia
Presidents of the College of William & Mary
Writers from Virginia
People from King and Queen County, Virginia
American slave owners
Pro-Confederate writers
American Fire-Eaters
19th-century American male writers
19th-century American non-fiction writers
American male non-fiction writers
19th-century American economists